The Stratus EJ 22 is an American aircraft engine, produced by Stratus 2000 of Corvallis, Oregon for use in homebuilt aircraft.

Design and development
The engine is based upon the Subaru EJ 22 automotive engine. It is a four-cylinder four-stroke, liquid-cooled, gasoline engine design, with a belt-type reduction drive with a reduction ratio of 2.2:1. It employs electronic ignition and produces  at 5900 rpm.

The company seems to have gone out of business about 2008 and production ended.

Specifications (EJ 22)

See also

References

Stratus aircraft engines
1990s aircraft piston engines